Branislav Ratkovica (born 27 July 1985) is a Serbian professional basketball coach and former player. He currently serves as a head coach for Metalac of the Basketball League of Serbia.

Professional career
Ratkovica started playing basketball for KK Drvomarket.

He made his professional debut for KK Atlas (then called Beopetrol) during the 2002–03 season. In the following season, Ratkovica made his debut in the ULEB Cup. For the 2004–05 season he was loaned to Avala Ada.

In the summer of 2007, Ratkovica signed a one-year contract with German team EWE Baskets Oldenburg. In the summer of 2008, Ratkovica moved to Walter Tigers Tübingen. 

After four years in Germany, Ratkovica signed a two-year contract with the Turkish club Aliağa Petkim. Ratkovica started the 2012–13 season with Aliağa Petkim, but he left the club after some matches and signed a one-year contract with Olin Edirne Basket.

In February 2013, he returned to Germany and signed with Artland Dragons for the rest of the season. The 2013–14 season Ratkovica started in Politekhnika-Halychyna, but after two games he left the club and signed for the rest of the season with Walter Tigers Tübingen. He also played there the 2014–15 season, where he was the League's assists leader. During the 2014–15 season, Ratkovica averaged 9.6 points, 2.8 rebounds and 7.2 assists.

In July 2015, Ratkovica signed with PBC Lukoil Academic. He played in the FIBA Europe Cup, where he averaged 7.9 points, 2.7 rebounds and 5.3 assists per game. He also won the Bulgarian League.

In July 2016, he signed a one-year contract with Partizan. On November 30, 2017, he signed a contract with Cibona.

Coaching career 
On 5 July 2019, Ratkovica was named an assistant coach for Mega Bemax of the Basketball League of Serbia.

On 5 June 2020, Ratkovica left Mega Bemax for OKK Beograd, which he took over as the head coach. He left Beograd in May 2021.

On 7 June 2021, Metalac Valjevo named Ratkovica as their new head coach.

References

External links
 Profile at aba-liga.com
 Profile at basketball-bundesliga
 Profile at eurobasket.com

1985 births
Living people
ABA League players
Aliağa Petkim basketball players
Artland Dragons players
Basketball League of Serbia players
BC Politekhnika-Halychyna players
Bosnia and Herzegovina expatriate basketball people in Serbia
EWE Baskets Oldenburg players
KK Avala Ada players
KK Beopetrol/Atlas Beograd players
KK Cibona players
KK Mega Basket players
KK Metalac coaches
KK Partizan players
OKK Beograd players
PBC Academic players
People from Gradačac
Point guards
Serbian men's basketball coaches
Serbian men's basketball players
Serbian expatriate basketball people in Bulgaria
Serbian expatriate basketball people in Croatia
Serbian expatriate basketball people in Germany
Serbian expatriate basketball people in Turkey
Serbian expatriate basketball people in Ukraine
Serbs of Bosnia and Herzegovina
Tigers Tübingen players